Casey Jones was an American baseball right fielder in the Negro leagues. He played with the Baltimore Black Sox in 1934.

References

External links
 and Seamheads

Baltimore Black Sox players
Year of birth unknown
Year of death unknown
Baseball outfielders